is a pair of inter-connected freshwater lakes in Hamatonbetsu, Esashi District, Sōya Subprefecture, Hokkaidō, Japan. Eight rivers flow into the lakes, and they drain into the Sea of Okhotsk. The lakes were designated a Ramsar site in July 1989, and host nearly 300 bird species either year round or as part of the avians' migratory pattern.

The site is considered especially important for the tundra swan and the white-tailed eagle. Many varieties of ducks use the site, as well, with 50,000-60,000 visiting the lakes annually. A bird banding facility and an observation center are found at the site.

Etymology and geography
The lake name is based on the Ainu kut-char (クㇳチャㇻ), meaning "marsh water outlet".

Lake Kutcharo consists to two interconnected smaller lakes, the smaller northern one called  and the larger southern one called . Six rivers flow into Konuma, which flows into Onuma via a small waterway at the northern end of Onuma.

Additionally, two rivers flow into Onuma. Tides can cause some seawater inflow into Onuma. The lake and the surrounding area was designated a Ramsar site in Japan in July 1989.

Fauna and flora
Lake Kutcharo is considered an import wintering and resting site in the migration of tundra swans, with 6000–10,000 visiting each year. More than 290 species of birds are found in and around the lake, especially ducks. About 50,000-60,000 ducks visit annually. The site is important for the conservation of the endangered white-tailed eagle.

The lake is surrounded on three sides by forests of firs and spruces. Ruppia occidentalis is known to grow in the shore area.

Facilities
The Kutcharo-ko Waterfowl Observation Center is located on the southern shore of Onuma, and a bird banding station is located at the southern end of the connecting waterway between the smaller lakes.

In popular culture 
Lake Acuity in Pokémon Diamond and Pearl and Pokémon Platinum is based on this lake as the Sinnoh region is a fictionalized version of Hokkaido.

See also
List of Ramsar sites in Japan

References

External links
 

Lakes of Hokkaido
Ramsar sites in Japan